Julianus Wagemans (4 August 1890 – 2 May 1965) was a Belgian gymnast who competed in the 1920 Summer Olympics. In 1920 he won the silver medal as member of the Belgian gymnastics team in the European system event. In the individual all-around competition he finished ninth.

References

1890 births
1965 deaths
Belgian male artistic gymnasts
Olympic gymnasts of Belgium
Gymnasts at the 1920 Summer Olympics
Olympic silver medalists for Belgium
Medalists at the 1920 Summer Olympics
Olympic medalists in gymnastics